Suruga may refer to:

Suruga Province, an old province in the central part of modern Shizuoka prefecture
Suruga-ku, Shizuoka, a ward of Shizuoka City, Japan
Suruga Bay, a bay on the Pacific coast of Honshū, Japan
Suruga Trough, a trough off the coast of Suruga Bay
 4383 Suruga, a main-belt asteroid
 Suruga fundicola, a species of fish in the goby family

See also
 Tsuruga, a city in Fukui Prefecture, Japan